Campbelltown railway station is located on the Main South line, serving the Sydney suburb of Campbelltown. It is served by Sydney Trains T8 Airport & South line services and NSW TrainLink services to Moss Vale, Goulburn, Canberra, Griffith and Melbourne.

History

Campbelltown Railway Station was briefly the southernmost extent of Great Southern Railway of New South Wales being situated at the end of the Liverpool to Campbelltown railway extension completed in 1858.

The station opened on 4 May 1858 with services commencing 17 May 1858. Preparations for the opening of the railway station commenced after a 3pm meeting at the Court House on 12 March 1858. In the meantime, the railway was progressing towards completion with the Chief Commissioner, Chief Engineer, and railway officials having inspected the progress of station construction on 29 April 1858.

The opening included an afternoon banquet, "with every delicacy upon the table which the colony can produce will be held in the goods station (which has been placed at the disposal of the committee by the Commission).", an evening ball, "upon a scale which would do credit to a much larger town than we can boast of", a band placed on an elevated platform, and separate male and female areas with each area to be waited upon by a man-servant and female respectively.

The revised Great Southern Railway timetable for the opening of the railway listed seven down, and seven up, services; five passenger services, and two mixed services. The journey time from Sydney was 1 hour 45 minutes with 8 stops for a 34-mile journey length. Services from Campbelltown commenced at 6am and finished at 5:30pm. However, soon after opening, the travel time had become 2 hours with services commencing at 6:50am and finishing at 5:45pm and the loss of a goods/mixed service.

Between 1882 and 1963, it was the junction station for the Campbelltown-Camden line.

On 5 May 1968, the Main South line was electrified from Liverpool. It was the extremity of the Sydney suburban network until extended to Macarthur opened in July 1985. However many services still terminate at Campbelltown.

In June 1999, an upgrade to the station including lifts was complete.

In January 2013, the Southern Sydney Freight Line opened on the western side of the station. The station is surrounded by an extensive network of sidings to stable terminating Sydney Trains rolling stock.

Since the second half of 2017, Campbelltown railway station has been served exclusively by the Airport and East Hills line, meaning commuters have to change at Glenfield to travel to either the city via Granville or to Blacktown via the Cumberland Line.

Platforms & services

To the west of the station is Campbelltown Yard, a large rail yard where trains are parked overnight and during the off-peak. The Southern Sydney Freight Line (leased to Australian Rail Track Corporation) also runs through Campbelltown Station. It has no platforms (as it is a freight line) and passes to the west of Campbelltown Yard. There are also a number of sidings and refuges around Campbelltown. Some of these sidings, such as the perway siding and the goods siding (the two dead ends north of the station), are unelectrified, and rarely used. There are no signals permitting a movement into the perway siding (the northern one), so the catch points must be manually closed after receiving permission from the signaller. The other siding is connected to platform 4, a dock platform used by terminating Southern Highlands line trains. All platforms at Campbelltown are long enough for 8 car suburban trains, with the exception of platform 4, which is around 100m long, enough to fit 4 Endeavour cars.

Transport links

Campbelltown Station Bus Interchange

Stand A: Busabout
890:  to Harrington Park 
890C: to Camden
891: to Mount Annan South, off-peak extension to Narellan 
892: to Mount Annan 
893: to Narellan 
894: peak hours only to Bridgewater Estate 
894X: peak hours only to Bridgewater Estate via Camden Bypass 
895: to Camden South 
896: to Oran Park Town Centre
897: to Smeaton Grange 
898: peak hours only to Harrington Park, occasional extension to Catherine Field

Stand B: Busabout
886: to Glen Alpine
887: to Wollongong 
888: to St Helens Park South 
889: to Menangle

Stand C: Picton Buslines
900: to Picton

Stand D: Busabout
884: to Airds
884W: to Wedderburn 
885: to Bradbury and St Helens Park North

Stand E: Busabout
878: to Eschol Park
879: to Leumeah
880: to Minto

Stand F: Busabout
881: to Leumeah North
882: to Leumeah South
883: to Ruse
883K: to Kentlyn

Stand G: Interline West side
840: to Campbelltown Hospital

Stand H: Interline West side
840: to Oran Park

Campbelltown station is served by one NightRide route:
N30: Macarthur station to Town Hall station

References

External links

Campbelltown station details Transport for New South Wales

Easy Access railway stations in Sydney
Railway stations in Sydney
Railway stations in Australia opened in 1858
Campbelltown, New South Wales
Main Southern railway line, New South Wales